Loud Mine was a gold mine in White County, Georgia north of Dahlonega; it was a famous mining site in the 19th century Georgia Gold Rush. The site is now owned by a private gold mining group, and permission is needed to go on the property.

External links
Gold nuggets from the Loud Mine sgulguik.gbui

Georgia Gold Rush
Gold mines in Georgia
Buildings and structures in White County, Georgia
Geology of Georgia (U.S. state)